Richard Alois is a Papua New Guinean footballer who usually plays as a forward. He comes out for the Papua New Guinean team Huawei PS United and the Papua New Guinean national football team.

Career

International
Alois made his first senior international appearance in a 2018 FIFA World Cup qualification game against Tahiti on 23 March 2017, having substituted Patrick Aisa in the 60th minute.

References

External links
 
 

Living people
Papua New Guinean footballers
Association football forwards
Papua New Guinea international footballers
Year of birth missing (living people)